was king of the Ryukyu Kingdom from 1713–1752. His reign, strongly guided by royal advisor Sai On, is regarded as a political and economic golden age and period of the flowering of Okinawan culture.

After succeeding his father Shō Eki in 1713, Shō Kei appointed his regent and trusted advisor Sai On to the Sanshikan, the Council of Three top royal advisors, in 1728. His reign is known for a great number of developments, including economic reforms and conservation efforts implemented under the guidance of Sai On, political changes, and scholarly developments.

References

1700 births
1752 deaths
Second Shō dynasty
Kings of Ryūkyū